CEWC (Council for Education in World Citizenship) Northern Ireland (or CEWC NI for short) is an educational charity based in Belfast, Northern Ireland. Originating as a Regional Council of CEWC, it achieved separate charitable status in 1991.  The original organization was founded in 1939.

Through its programme of Active Global Citizenship Projects, CEWC NI enables young people from post-primary schools and youth groups to understand and confront global issues and challenges. It supports international understanding and citizenship as a means of promoting diversity.  The Universal Declaration of Human Rights and the Convention on the Rights of the Child underpin its work.

See also
 CEWC (England)
 CEWC-Cymru

References

External links
 CEWC Northern Ireland

Education in Northern Ireland
Charities based in Northern Ireland